Yellow Shirts or yellow shirt may refer to:

People's Alliance for Democracy or Yellow Shirts, a Thai movement protesting against Thaksin Shinawatra and his successors
Yellow Shirts, the armed wing of the Black Hundreds, an ultra-nationalist movement in Russia in the early 20th century
Yellow Shirts, members of the United States Waterskiing Team
The yellow jersey worn by the current leader in some cycling races, including the Tour de France
The yellow vests movement, a French populist grassroots political movement for economic justice
Sportske novosti Yellow Shirt award, annual award for the best footballer in the Croatian league